A Kiom is a village in south-eastern Laos near the border with Vietnam. It is located in Kaleum District in Sekong Province.

Populated places in Sekong Province